Výškov is a municipality and village in Louny District in the Ústí nad Labem Region of the Czech Republic. It has about 500 inhabitants.

Administrative parts
The village of Počerady is an administrative part of Výškov.

References

Villages in Louny District